Kelly and Me is a 1957 American comedy film directed by Robert Z. Leonard and written by Everett Freeman. The film stars Van Johnson, Piper Laurie, Martha Hyer, Onslow Stevens, Herbert Anderson, Douglas Fowley and Frank Wilcox. The film was released on April 10, 1957, by Universal Pictures.

Plot
Len Carmody, a failure in theatrical venues, finds success in talking films when he finds a trained dog.

Cast        
Van Johnson as Len Carmody
Piper Laurie as Mina Van Runkel
Martha Hyer as Lucy Castle
Onslow Stevens as Walter Van Runkel
Herbert Anderson as Ben Collins
Douglas Fowley as Dave Gans
Frank Wilcox as George Halderman
Dan Riss as Stu Baker
Maurice Manson as Mr. Johnson
Gregory Gaye as Milo
Yvonne Peattie as Miss Boyle
Elizabeth Flournoy as Miss Wilk
Lyle Latell as Joe Webb

References

External links
 

1957 films
American comedy films
1957 comedy films
CinemaScope films
Universal Pictures films
Films directed by Robert Z. Leonard
Films scored by Henry Mancini
1950s English-language films
1950s American films